Château de Weckmund is a ruined castle in the commune of Husseren-les-Châteaux, in the department of Haut-Rhin, Alsace, France. It is a listed historical monument since 1840.

References

Ruined castles in Haut-Rhin
Monuments historiques of Haut-Rhin